Livistona decora is a species of palm endemic to the sclerophyll woodlands of Queensland, Australia. It is known only from Magnetic Island near the City of Townsville, and south along the coast as far as Rainbow Beach.  The species is now widely cultivated in arid regions worldwide as a decorative plant.

Livistona decora is up to 18 m tall. Leaves are costapalmate with petioles up to 300 long, with black spines along the margins. Inflorescences are up to 350 cm long, producing shiny black fruits up to 20 mm in diameter.

References

decora
Flora of Queensland
Palms of Australia
Drought-tolerant trees
Bushfood
Edible plants